Pine Level can refer to:
 Pine Level, Alabama (disambiguation)
 Pine Level, Florida (disambiguation)
 Pine Level, North Carolina (disambiguation)